Antigonish may refer to:

Places
Antigonish, Nova Scotia, a town in Nova Scotia, Canada
Municipality of the County of Antigonish, an incorporated county municipality in Nova Scotia, Canada
 Antigonish (electoral district)
 Antigonish (provincial electoral district), in Nova Scotia, Canada

Other uses
 "Antigonish" (poem), 1899 poem by Hughes Mearns, also known as "The Little Man Who Wasn't There"
 Antigonish Arena, in Nova Scotia, Canada
 Antigonish Movement
 Diocese of Antigonish, in the Roman Catholic Church
 HMCS Antigonish (K661), a River class frigate